Sayali Gokhale (born 1 February 1987) is a badminton player from India. She was the gold medalist at the 2010 Dhaka South Asian Games in the women's singles and team events. Gokhale claimed the Indian National Championship in 2008 and 2012.

Achievements

South Asian Games 
Women's singles

BWF International Challenge/Series 
Women's singles

  BWF International Challenge tournament
  BWF International Series tournament

References

External links
 

Living people
1987 births
Sportswomen from Maharashtra
Marathi people
Indian female badminton players
21st-century Indian women
21st-century Indian people
Indian national badminton champions
South Asian Games gold medalists for India
South Asian Games medalists in badminton